Jimsmith Lake Provincial Park is a provincial park in British Columbia, Canada.  The small park has Jimsmith Lake surrounded by mixed forest.  It is located just south of Cranbrook.

The Jimsmith Lake Provincial Park is spread over an area of 13.70 hectares. Forests of Douglas fir, also known as the Colombian Pine, and larch cover the lake shore. The park is popular haunt for picnickers and visitors from the nearby city of Cranbrook. The park has some 35 camping sites. In 2001, they were modified to accommodate recreational vehicles. The park draws visitors for recreational activities like sunbathing, swimming, non-motorized boating and picnicking. Nature walks and bird watching are also popular activities here. In winter, when the park is covered in snow, people also enjoy ice skating.

References

Provincial parks of British Columbia
Parks in the Regional District of East Kootenay
Year of establishment missing